Jalan Prof Diraja Ungku Aziz, previously as Jalan Universiti, is a major road in Petaling Jaya city, Selangor, Malaysia. It is the first dual-carriageway road built in Malaysia since independence. On 31 December 2020, the authorities announced plans to rename the road to Jalan Prof Diraja Ungku Aziz in honour of the late economist Ungku Abdul Aziz.

Landmarks
British American Tobacco factory
Bulatan Rothmans roundabout
Sin Chew Daily press centre
International Islamic University Malaysia (IIAM) Petaling Jaya campus
Pharmaceutical Services Division, Ministry of Health Malaysia
National Pharmaceutical Control Bureau (NPCB), Ministry of Health Malaysia
Jaya One
Bulatan Universiti roundabout
University Malaya
University Malaya Medical Centre
EPF building

List of junctions

References

Roads and Railways, Chapter 4: Infrastructures and Communications, Encyclopedia of Malaysia: The Economy (Volume Editor: Prof. Dr H. Osman Rani)

Roads in Petaling Jaya